Social Democratic Women (SDŽ) the women's wing of the Czech Social Democratic Party. The organisation supports gender equality and gender quotas for candidates of the party. SDŹ was founded in 1990. It constitutes the Czech section of the Socialist International Women.

References

External links
Official Website

Czech Social Democratic Party
1990 establishments in Czechoslovakia
Political parties established in 1990
Women's wings of political parties in the Czech Republic